Tanjung Harapan Airport  is an airport in Tanjung Selor, North Kalimantan, Indonesia. It is located on the island of Kalimantan, also known as Borneo.

Airlines and destinations

The following airlines offer scheduled passenger service:

Runway extension
In 2015, the current 1,200 meters runway has been extended to 1,600 meters to accommodate ATR-72 from current ATR-42, so passengers from Tanjung Harapan Airport can fly directly to Balikpapan and without having to transit in Tarakan anymore. It was decided to use 2015 North Kalimantan Province budget with amount Rp 10 billion ($0.8 million) to extend runway 350 meters towards the hill (direction TH 21) and 50 meters towards the Selor River (direction TH 03). The hill was cut and the road at the hill relocated.

References

External links
 

Airports in North Kalimantan